On 24th December 2022 a bus crashed into the Lérez river in  Galicia, Spain, leaving seven people dead and two injured.

Reactions 
President of Galicia Alfonso Rueda told reporters that the search and rescue efforts had been helped by a break in the rain. “It is always awful to have to talk about an accident like this, but at this time of year, it is even more horrifying".

See also
 2022 Omdurman bus crash

References 

2022 in Galicia (Spain)
Bus incidents in Spain
2022 disasters in Spain
History of Galicia (Spain)
December 2022 events in Spain
2022 road incidents